The 1972 Football League Cup Final took place on 4 March 1972 at Wembley Stadium and was contested by Chelsea and Stoke City.

Chelsea went into the match as strong favourites having won the FA Cup and the UEFA Cup Winners' Cup in the previous two seasons, whereas Stoke were attempting to win their first major trophy. Terry Conroy put Stoke into the lead early on, but Chelsea hit back through Peter Osgood just before half time. Stoke got the decisive final goal from veteran George Eastham to end their 109-year wait for a major honour. It remains the club's only major trophy victory; the closest they have come since then to beating this achievement was in 2011 when they lost to Manchester City in the 2011 FA Cup Final.

Match review
Both sides reached the final after semi-final ties with Chelsea beating Tottenham Hotspur and Stoke, West Ham United. The match took place on 4 March 1972 at Wembley Stadium in front of 97,852 with around 35,000 travelling down from Stoke-on-Trent.

Despite it being Stoke's first major final they showed no signs of nerves as they took the game to the "Blues" and after only five minutes, a long throw-in from Peter Dobing was headed on by Denis Smith. Chelsea's defence panicked and Terry Conroy was quickest to react to put Stoke into the lead. Chelsea improved their game, but it was Stoke who should have scored again with both Dobing and Jimmy Greenhoff being denied by the agile Peter Bonetti. A rare mistake from Alan Bloor inside his own goal-area brought Chelsea an equaliser just before half-time with Peter Osgood taking full advantage.

After the break Stoke again forced Chelsea back into their own half and although the play became rather scrappy both sides should have scored. But then on 73 minutes George Eastham scored a second goal for Stoke after Greenhoff's shot was only blocked by Bonetti. Gordon Banks made a number of saves to keep Stoke's one goal advantage intact and Stoke held out to secure their first major trophy. The club marked the achievement by parading the trophy in an open top bus around Stoke-on-Trent.

Match details

Road to Wembley
Home teams listed first.

References

External links
1972 League Cup final at The English Football Archive
Match stats at soccerbase.com
Final line-ups at Football Focus

EFL Cup Finals
League Cup Final 1972
League Cup Final 1972
1971–72 Football League
Football League Cup Final
Football League Cup Final